Springboro High School is a public high school in Springboro, Ohio, United States, with a total of over 2,000 students and 120 teachers. The Springboro Community City School District serves the city of Springboro and parts of Franklin, Clearcreek, Wayne, and Turtlecreek townships.

Springboro High School is the only public high school in the suburb of Springboro and the only high school in the Springboro Community City School District. The school has been ranked academically "excellent" on a consistent basis, the highest possible rating by the state of Ohio Department of Education. SHS was established in 1893. In the 2011-12 school year SHS was honored as the top public high school in the Great Lakes region and was recognized as part of the United States Department of Education's National Blue Ribbon Schools Program.

The current home of SHS has been open since August 1998 with two new academic wings added on and opened in August 2006. It is Springboro's third building used as the high school within the past forty years.

Athletics
Springboro High School athletic teams are known as the Panthers, while the school colors are white and royal blue. The athletic program was a charter member of the Fort Ancient Valley Conference from 1964, when it joined as Clearcreek High School, until 1998. After many years of winning the All-Sports Trophy in the former Mid-Miami League, Springboro left for the Greater Western Ohio Conference, keeping  heated rivalries with Lebanon High School and Miamisburg High School

Springboro Community Schools completed a multimillion-dollar partnership with Miami Valley Hospital, giving them naming rights to the stadium CareFlight Field, named for the hospital's "CareFlight" helicopter. This deal also provides CareFlight Field with turf surfacing, a new track, and a three-story building which will house doctors' offices and athletic facilities, along with an adjoining press box. It was completed in 2009.

Along with the football facilities, SHS basketball coach Troy Holtrey raised over $23,000 during the summer of 2006 to build a state of the art locker room. It comes complete with custom built lockers, automatic-retracting  projector screen with high quality sound, and custom Springboro Panthers carpeting.

Notable alumni
Amy Tucker (Class of 1978), All-American Basketball Player for Ohio State University, assistant coach at Stanford University
Brad Lamb (Class of 1986), NFL Football Player for the Buffalo Bills in 1992 and 1993; played in Super Bowl XXVII.
Tommy Kessler (Class of 2000), guitarist for Blondie, 2010–current.
Tony Campana (Class of 2004), outfielder, Chicago Cubs, 2011–2012.
Jake Ballard (Class of 2006), tight end, New York Giants 2010–2011 (played in Super Bowl XLVI), New England Patriots 2012, Arizona Cardinals 2013.

References

External links
 District Website

High schools in Warren County, Ohio
Public high schools in Ohio